Iwan Bala (born Richard Iwan Ellis Roberts) is a Welsh artist, born May 1956 in Sarnau, Merionethshire, near Bala.

Biography
Iwan Bala was raised in Gwyddelwern, near Corwen, Denbighshire, and attended Ysgol y Berwyn comprehensive school in Bala. He studied geography and politics at the University of Aberystwyth from 1974, then from 1975 until 1977 he studied fine art at Cardiff College of Art. He gained an MA in fine art from the University of Wales Institute Cardiff in 1993. Bala is Welsh-speaking.

In 1990 he became artist in residence at the National Gallery of Zimbabwe. In 1993 he presented the S4C arts programme .

From 2007 to 2015 Bala was senior lecturer at the School of Creative Arts and Humanities at University of Wales, Trinity Saint David, Carmarthen.

Bala creates his art-work using memorised and imagined maps and landscapes, commenting on Welsh culture. He has won many prizes including the Gold Medal in Fine Art at the National Eisteddfod of Wales in 1997 (and a prize winner in 1988, 1989 and 1993). He won the Glyndŵr Award in 1998, "for outstanding contributions to the arts in Wales". He has also been recipient of grants from the Arts Council of Wales, including a travel grant to visit Zimbabwe in 1990, research funding for "Certain Welsh Artists", a collection of essays published by Seren Books in 1999 and a Career Development Grant (printmaking) 2001. He was also awarded a Wales Art International travel grant to Galicia in 2004 and Brittany in 2007.
 
Bala's work is held in many public and private collections including the National Museum Wales (Derek Williams Trust), the Museum of Modern Art Wales, the Imperial War Museum, the Contemporary Art Society for Wales, Newport Museum and Art Gallery, Y Gaer, A Fundacion Casa Museo "A Solaina" de Pilono, Galicia, The University of Glamorgan and The National Library of Wales.

In 2012 Bala collaborated with poet, and fellow lecturer at Trinity Saint David's, Menna Elfyn for an exhibition called Field-notes.

Publications
 Intimate Portraits, 1995 (Seren)
 Welsh Art Goes International, 1996 (Planet)
 Welsh Painters Talking, 1997 (Seren)
 Appropriate Behaviour, 1997 (Planet)
 ), 2000 (Gwasg Carreg Gwalch)
 Certain Welsh Artists, 1999 (Seren)
 here+now, 2004 (Seren)
 Groundbreaking – The Artist in the Changing Landscape, 2005 (Seren)
 ), 2007 (Gwasg Gomer)

References

External links
Iwan Bala's website
BBC: Places and pictures
 
BBC: Report on Iwan Bala's exhibition with poet Mena Elfyn by Polly March
Planet Magazine: Audio interview with Iwan Bala by Osi Rhys Osmond
Trinity Saint David: Overview of Iwan Bala
British Council: Overview of Iwan Bala
Wales Arts International: Overview of Iwan Bala

1956 births
20th-century Welsh painters
20th-century Welsh male artists
21st-century Welsh painters
21st-century Welsh male artists
Living people
Gwyddelwern
Alumni of Cardiff School of Art and Design
Alumni of Aberystwyth University
Welsh Eisteddfod Gold Medal winners
Welsh male painters